Paul Demasy (21 March 1884 – 30 January 1974) was a francophone Belgian playwright.

Main works 
Theatre
1919: La Tragédie d'Alexandre
1924: Jésus de Nazareth
1925: 
1926: Dalilah
1933: Milmort
1925: Panurge
1937: Midi à quatorze heures
1939: L'Homme de nuit
1959: Materna
1959: Vannina ou la Survivante
1964: L'Indésirable

Bibliography 
 Daniel Droixhe, « Le désarroi démocratique dans Panurge (1935) de Paul Demasy », Bruxelles, Académie royale de langue et de littérature françaises de Belgique, 2007.

External links 
 Paul Demasy on IdRef

Belgian writers in French
20th-century Belgian dramatists and playwrights
Belgian male dramatists and playwrights
Writers from Liège
1884 births
1974 deaths